Bolkhovsky (masculine), Bolkhovskaya (feminine), or Bolkhovskoye (neuter) is the name of several rural localities in Russia:
Bolkhovskoye, Lipetsk Oblast, a selo in Bolkhovskoy Selsoviet of Zadonsky District of Lipetsk Oblast
Bolkhovskoye, Nizhny Novgorod Oblast, a selo in Vasilyevsky Selsoviet of Sechenovsky District of Nizhny Novgorod Oblast